Brownlea, also known as the Rufus C. Brown House, is a historic home located at Fayetteville, Cumberland County, North Carolina. It was built in 1939, and is a five-part Colonial Revival style stone dwelling.  It consists of a two-story main block, flanked by -story wings, with garage and sunroom appendages.  Also on the property are a contributing well house and barbeque pit, both built in 1939.

It was listed on the National Register of Historic Places in 2003.

References

Houses on the National Register of Historic Places in North Carolina
Colonial Revival architecture in North Carolina
Houses completed in 1939
Houses in Fayetteville, North Carolina
National Register of Historic Places in Cumberland County, North Carolina